The National Democratic Party  (Erovnul Demokratiuli Partia) was a political party in Georgia, between 1917 and 1923. In the 1919 Georgian parliamentary election, the party received 6.08% of the vote, garnering 8 of the 130 seats.

Political parties in Georgia (country)